Tom Kerssens (born 2 April 2004) is a Dutch footballer who plays for Jong AZ as a midfielder.

Career
Keersens signed his first professional contract with AZ Alkmaar in June 2021. He spoke of his pride at this as he is local to Alkmaar and has been a fan of the club since he was 5 years old. Kerssens made his Eerste Divisie debut on the 18 March 2022, away at Jong FC Utrecht.  He was part of the as the AZ under-18 side that won a league and cup double in the 2021-22 season.

References

External links
 

Living people
2004 births
Dutch footballers
Eerste Divisie players
AZ Alkmaar players